Boulevard Records is a Canadian independent record label, founded by Vincent DeGiorgio, specializing in Hi-NRG music. It released several albums by Tapps.

Artists
Artists include:
 Tapps
 Man 2 Man
 Fire & Ice

References

Canadian independent record labels